This article lists the Canadian number-one albums of 1972. The chart was compiled and published by RPM every Saturday.

The untitled album that became later known as Led Zeppelin IV was listed as New Led Zeppelin Album. Three acts held the top position in the albums and singles charts simultaneously: Don McLean for four weeks from January 29 – February 19, Neil Young on April 8 and America on May 6.

(Entries with dates marked thus* are not presently on record at Library and Archives Canada and were inferred from the following week's listing. )

See also
1972 in music
RPM number-one hits of 1972

References

1972
1972 in Canadian music